Arnaldo Riva (born 29 June 1923, date of death unknown), also known as Aldo Riva, was an Italian professional football player. Riva was born in Milan in June 1923. He played one season (1947/48) in the Serie A for A.S. Roma. Riva is deceased.

References

External links
Profile at Enciclopediadelcalcio.it

1923 births
Year of death missing
Italian footballers
Serie A players
Montevarchi Calcio Aquila 1902 players
A.S. Roma players
U.S. Cremonese players
S.S.D. Sanremese Calcio players
Association football midfielders